Nuraghe Mannu is a nuragic archaeological site located about  above sea level overlooking the village of Cala Gonone. It is located on the east coast of Sardinia, in the middle of the gulf of Orosei, province of Nuoro and the municipality of Dorgali. The Nuraghe is partially visible from below and from the coast, from the top it gives a clear view over the surrounding area.

History 
Currently the area surrounding the site is the subject of research and archaeological excavations. The first explorer of the area was Antonio Taramelli who in 1927 denounced the damage that the local people did, caused by them using the stones of the monument for the construction of their homes and streets. The scholar discovered the northernmost and the southernmost building dating back to the Roman Period.

Structure 
The Nuraghe is a single small tower, is 4.70 meters tall at the highest point and is built with large polyhedral stones of basaltic and trachyte rock. The main facade overlooks the stretch of mountainous coast above the beach of Cala Fuili. The structure of the tower is very modest compared to the great extension of the Nuragic village that lies at its feet. The village consists of various circular huts made of unpolished stones and of rectangular buildings constructed with stones placed on top of each other without any kind of adhesive.

Function 
The function of this large and imposing structure is assumed to be a watch tower because the Nuraghe is located next to another larger archaeological site "On Nuragheddu" which apparently had the function of defending the population from attack.

Finds 
Brick fragments and Roman pottery were found around the Nuraghe. The youth employment group that works in the territory of Dorgali / Cala Gonone has unearthed fragments of vases and cups dating back to the Nuragic; while other fragments found near the wall, belong to pots and pans.

Image gallery

Bibliography
 Antonio Taramelli, Foglio 208. Dorgali, in the Edizione della Carta Archeologica d'Italia, Florence, Military Geographical Institute, 1929
 Antonio Taramelli, in Notizie degli Scavi, IX, 1933
 M.A. Fadda, Nuraghe Mannu, in Dorgali. Documenti Archeologici, Sassari, Chiarella, 1980, pp. 199–205
 M.A. Fadda, Dorgali (Nuoro). Nuraghe Mannu, in I Sardi. La Sardegna dal paleolitico all'età romana, Milano, Jaca Book, 1984, pp. 216–217
 M.A. Fadda-P. Pruneti, Operazione Nuraghe Mannu, in Archeologia Viva, 48, novembre-dicembre 1994
 M.A. Fadda-S. Massetti, Quattro campagne di scavo con l'Operazione nuraghe Mannu, in Bollettino di Archeologia, 1997, 43-45, pp. 217–221
 Dorgali. Documenti archeologici, Sassari, 1980, Chiarella, p. 109-113, 115-140

Buildings and structures in Sardinia
World Heritage Sites in Italy
Archaeological sites in Sardinia
Former populated places in Italy
Tourist attractions in Sardinia
Nuraghe
Nuoro